Sbeitla or Sufetula is a small town in west-central Tunisia. Nearby are the Byzantine ruins of Sufetula, containing the best preserved Byzantine forum temples in Tunisia. It was the entry point of the Muslim conquest of North Africa.

Sbeitla is the capital of the largest delegation in Kasserine Governorate with an area of 1133.5 km2. It is located in 33 km in the west of the governorate, and 264 km to Tunis. It has a population of 23,844 (2014 estimate). Sbeitla is mentioned in Noman Douglas's Fountains in the Sand as being wooded by junipers and Aleppo pines as late as the 19th century, though he found them "bleak and bare" in the early 20th century.

History 

The oldest traces of civilisation in the zone are Punic megaliths and funereal stelae.

The region was inhabited by nomadic tribes until the Legio III Augusta established a camp at Ammaedara. Through the surrender of the Berber leader Tacfarinas, the region was pacified and populated under the Roman emperor Vespasian and his sons between 67 and 69, becoming a bishopric in the Roman province of Byzacena.

Some inscriptions found in the city suggest that the settlement had success along the lines of others in North Africa during the 2nd century, reaching great prosperity through the olive industry, whose cultivation benefited from excellent climatic conditions in the region. The olive presses found in the ruins of the city further bolster this conclusion. The resulting prosperity made possible the construction of a splendid forum and other important buildings.

The city began to decline during the Late Empire, during which the city was surrounded and occupied by Vandals, a fact that is demonstrated by the appearance of temples dedicated to their gods.

The arrival of the Byzantines inaugurated a new period of splendor. In 647, the fields before the city were the site of a major battle between the Byzantines and Berbers of Gregory the Patrician and the Rashidun Caliphate's governor of Egypt, Abdullah ibn Saad. The Battle of Sufetula ended in a decisive Muslim victory, which shook Byzantine control over the region and signalled the beginning of the Muslim conquest of North Africa.

The caliph at the time of the battle was Uthman ibn Affan, who set the army under the leadership of Abdullah ibn Saad. At his arrival to Barqa, Uqba ibn Nafi and his troops joined the main army and the two commanders prepared together the plan to conquer Sbeitla. The battle was long and hard, and Caliph Uthman sent reinforcement under the leadership of Abd Allah ibn al-Zubayr. The three leaders prepared a new battle plan and they finally succeeded in taking Sufetula.

The Muslim conquest marked the end of the diocese of Sufetula, which was however nominally revived as a Catholic titular bishopric.

Geography 
Sbeitla is located in western central Tunisia. By road it is 33 kilometres (29 mi) north-east of Kasserine, 246 kilometres (180 mi) south-west of Tunis, and 166 kilometres (141 mi) south-west of Sousse. The city is known by its semi-arid climate.

Culture 
Thanks to the well preserved archaeological site with its prestigious Roman forum, the cultural activities in Sbeitla have prospered. An annual festival is organised in the forum.

Museums 
The archaeological museum of Sbeitla houses several sculptures and mosaics. It consists of three exhibition rooms: the first one is about the Capsian culture, the second about the rest of Dionysus' empire, and the third contains two mosaics.

Festivals 
Since 2000, the city holds its Spring International festival each year, it is an international celebration where many famous actors like Mahmoud Yacine and authors like Mahmoud Messadi were honored. The city celebrates also its international festival named also festival abadelah of Sbeitla. It was founded in 2000, and it became international in 2013.

Economy 
The economy of Sbeitla relays on handicraft, agricultural and petroleum production managed by ETAP in the oil field of Douleb.

Smuggling goods and oil from Algerian Borders represent a major parallel economy activity in the region.

Agricultural 
The city is surrounded by a large field of agriculture of olive, almond and animal husbandry. It contains 919 shallow wells, 137 deep wells, a mountain lake and a mountain dam the irrigated Area remains limited to 2930 hectares.

Petroleum industries
The Oil field of Douleb is one of the fields explored by ETAP, since April 12, 1968 and it produces 230 000 barrels\year. In 1974, the field reached it maximal productivity with 1200m3 per day.

Handicraft

The majority of handicraft known in Sbeitla relay on wool processing. Tunisian barnous is one of those handcrafts.

Sports 
Sbeitla's most popular sport club is Union Sportive Sbeitla also known as USS, the club plays in the Tunisian ligue professionnelle 3 before being promoted to ligue 2 in the 2013 season .
The team currently plays in the Third Tunisian League. 

On June 5, 2013, the club advanced to the Quarter-finals of Tunisian Cup for the first time in its history. After defeating Stade Tunisien, the club was eliminated by CA Bizertin.

Notable people
 Ali Ben Ghedhahem (1814 - October 10, 1867) a famous Tunisian revolutionary.
Mongi Soussi Zarrouki (February 24, 1936 – May 26, 2000) is an athlete who participated in 1960 Summer Olympics and in the 1959 Mediterranean Games.
 Lotfi Ben Jeddou (July 31, 1964) is a politician who was the Minister of the Interior from March 2013 to february 2015.

See also 
 Sufetula (see), the former Catholic bishopric turned titular see

References

External links 
 Lexicorient

Populated places in Kasserine Governorate
Roman sites in Tunisia
69 establishments
Communes of Tunisia
Populated places of the Byzantine Empire
Roman amphitheaters in North Africa
Ancient Roman buildings and structures in Tunisia